Aveteian (Dixon Reef) is a possibly extinct language of Vanuatu, presumably one of the Malekula Interior languages. In the early twentieth century it was spoken by a few families living to the north of Ninde.

References

Malekula languages
Languages of Vanuatu
Extinct languages of Oceania
Critically endangered languages